Heidelberger Schlossfestspiele is a theatre festival in Germany.
Every summer festival take place in the inner courtyard or in other areas of the Heidelberg Palace. It first opened in 2001.

Organization 
The Heidelberg Castle Festival is organized by the Theater & Orchester Heidelberg. The artistic director there is also the festival director. Guest performances were also integrated in the pre-war period, but today the festival management consciously relies on exclusively "in-house" productions.

References 

Theatre festivals in Germany